Brajbir Saran Das (15 December 1925 – 14 October 2016) was an Indian politician in the state of Sikkim. He served as a Chief administrative officer from April 9, 1973 until July 23, 1974. He was awarded the Padma Shri in 1972. He died in October 2016 at the age of 90.

References

Bibliography

1925 births
2016 deaths
20th-century Indian politicians
Recipients of the Padma Shri in civil service